The Sri Lankan lion (Panthera leo sinhaleyus), also known as the Ceylonese lion, is an extinct prehistoric subspecies of lion, excavated in Sri Lanka. It is believed to have become extinct prior to the arrival of culturally modern humans, . 

This lion is only known from two teeth found in deposits at Kuruwita. Based on these teeth, P. Deraniyagala proposed this subspecies in 1939. However, there is insufficient information to determine how it might differ from other subspecies of lion. Deraniyagala did not explain explicitly how he diagnosed the holotype of this subspecies as belonging to a lion, though he justified its allocation to a distinct subspecies of lion by its being "narrower and more elongate" than those of recent lions in the British Natural History Museum collection.

See also
Asiatic lion
Panthera leo fossilis

References

 

leo sinhaleyus
leo sinhaleyus
Pleistocene carnivorans
Pleistocene extinctions
Pleistocene mammals of Asia
Fossil taxa described in 1938
Taxa named by Paulus Edward Pieris Deraniyagala